HMS Rose was a 28-gun  sixth-rate frigate of the Royal Navy. Rose was first commissioned in August 1783 under the command of Captain James Hawkins.

Fate
Rose, under the command of Captain Matthew Scott, left Port Royal, Jamaica on 26 June 1794. The next day she encountered a merchant vessel that passed on the news that Admiral Sir John Jervis and his fleet were off Basse Terre, which news led Scott to attempt to meet up with them. The night of 28 June was dark and rain squalls hid the sound of breakers, with the result that at 9pm Rose hit a reef off Rocky Point, Jamaica. The crew threw guns overboard and cut away her anchors, top masts and mizzen-mast, all in a futile attempt to lighten her and get her off the rocks. In the morning, as she filled with water, her crew abandoned ship in her boats and on rafts that they fashioned out of booms and spars.

Citations and references
Citations

References

 Robert Gardiner, The First Frigates, Conway Maritime Press, London 1992. .
 David Lyon, The Sailing Navy List, Conway Maritime Press, London 1993. .

External links
 

 

1783 ships
Sixth-rate frigates of the Royal Navy
Maritime incidents in 1794